Vicki Hirsch was an American theater instructor and actress.

She held a B.A. in Theatre from the University of Delaware, and an M.A. in Theatre from Villanova University. She also studied at the Russian Academy of Theatre Arts in Moscow, where she trained with World Master Gennadi Bogdanov in Russian Classical Biomechanics. Hirsch has been a professional actress for over 24 years, working in theater regionally and in New York City, as well as in film, television, industrials, print and commercials. Hirsch has taught acting at the Piero Dusa Acting Conservatory, Actors Creative Experience and the American Academy of Dramatic Arts. She was Casting Director and an Artistic Associate for Kings County Shakespeare Company.

References

Year of birth missing (living people)
Living people
21st-century American women
American film actresses
American stage actresses
American television actresses
University of Delaware alumni
Villanova University alumni